Flemming Jensen is a Danish lightweight rower.

At the 1982 World Rowing Championships in Lucerne, he won a bronze medal with the lightweight men's four. At the 1983 World Rowing Championships in Duisburg, he started with the lightweight men's eight and came third. He won a gold medal at the 1984 World Rowing Championships in Montreal with the lightweight men's eight. At the 1986 World Rowing Championships in Nottingham, he won another bronze medal with the lightweight men's eight. At the 1987 World Rowing Championships in Copenhagen, he came fifth with the lightweight men's four.

References

Year of birth missing (living people)
Danish male rowers
World Rowing Championships medalists for Denmark
Living people